Talal Hawat is a Lebanese politician. He has served as Minister of Telecommunications in the cabinet of Hassan Diab from 21 January 2020 to 10 September 2021. On 10 August 2020, the entire cabinet resigned and he served in a caretaker capacity until the formation of Najib Mikati’s new government on 10 September 2021.

References 

Living people
Year of birth missing (living people)
Place of birth missing (living people)
Government ministers of Lebanon

Arab Liberation Party politicians
Lebanese Sunni Muslims